Shahid Qoddusi High School is located in Qom, Iran, and named after Ayatollah Qoddusi. This high school, is designed for exceptionally talented students in Iran, and is managed under the National Organization for Development of Exceptional Talents (NODET). Students are selected through a nationwide entrance exam that is designed to measure intelligence of students. Students study subjects in depth, similar to college courses. Shahid Qoddusi School is boys-only, while Farzanegan is the equivalent school for girls.

See also
Qoddusi
Haghani Circle

References

External links
 Official web site

Boys' schools in Iran
Education in Qom Province